Casualties of War is the fourth studio album by American hip hop supergroup Boot Camp Clik. It was released on August 14, 2007 through Duck Down Music, and is compiled of leftover tracks recorded for the group's previous album, 2006's The Last Stand. Recording sessions took place at CDR Studio'z in New York. Production was handled by Coptic, Dan the Man, Soul G, Marco Polo, 9th Wonder, Chris the Four, Dub Z, Fred Bear, Jaywan Inc., Marvel da Beat Bandit, Moods and Vibrations Prod. and Nottz, with Buckshot and Drew "Dru-Ha" Friedman serving as executive producers. The album features contributions from seven of the eight original members with O.G.C.'s Louieville Sluggah being the only absent member, as well as guest appearances from Ruste Juxx, Supreme, 5ft, Blue Flame and G-Tang.

Track listing

Personnel

Boot Camp Clik
Kenyatta "Buckshot" Blake – vocals (tracks: 2-12, 14), executive producer
Darrell "Steele" Yates, Jr. – vocals (tracks: 2-8, 10-12, 14)
Tekomin "Tek" Williams – vocals (tracks: 2-6, 8-10, 13, 14)
Jahmal "Rock" Bush – vocals (tracks: 3, 5, 8, 11, 12)
Sean "Ruck" Price – vocals (tracks: 3, 4, 7, 11)
Dashawn "Top Dog" Yates – vocals (tracks: 3, 11)
Jack "Starang Wondah" McNair – vocals (track 4)

Guest musicians
N. "G-Tang" Friedman – vocals (track 1)
Victor "Ruste Juxx" Evans – vocals (tracks: 5, 10)
Kasim "5ft" Reid – vocals (track 5)
Demetrio "Supreme of the Representativz" Muniz – vocals (tracks: 7, 11)
A. "Blue Flame" Green – vocals (track 9)

Technical
Dan Humiston – producer (tracks: 1, 4, 5), mixing
Eric "Coptic" Matlock – producer (tracks: 2, 9, 12)
Gerald "Soul G" Stevens – producer (tracks: 2, 9, 12)
Dominick "Nottz" Lamb – producer (track 3)
Fred Levy – producer (track 4)
Chris Brown – producer (track 5)
Marco Bruno – producer (tracks: 6, 11)
Patrick "9th Wonder" Douthit – producer (track 7)
Jaywan Zeglis – producer (track 8)
B. "Marvel" Stefanic – producer (track 10)
Miguel Richardson – producer (track 13)
Jeff Steinbacher – producer (track 14)
Drew "Dru-Ha" Friedman – executive producer
Rob "Giambi" Garcia – engineering
C/4 – engineering
M Nasty – engineering
Michael Sarsfield – mastering
Skrilla Design – art direction, design
Todd Cameron Westphal – photography

References

External links

2007 albums
Boot Camp Clik albums
Duck Down Music albums
Albums produced by Nottz
Albums produced by 9th Wonder
Albums produced by Marco Polo